Monochroa melagonella is a moth of the family Gelechiidae. It was described by Constant in 1895. It is found in Portugal, Spain, France, Italy and on Cyprus.

The wingspan is about 8 mm.

The larvae feed on Rubia peregrina and Rubia tenuifolia. The frass is dispersed in black grains. Larvae can be found from March to July.

References

Moths described in 1895
Monochroa